The 1944 Pittsburgh Pirates season was the 63rd season of the Pittsburgh Pirates franchise; the 58th in the National League. The Pirates finished second in the league standings with a record of 90–63.

Regular season

Season standings

Record vs. opponents

Game log

|- bgcolor="ffbbbb"
| 1 || April 18 || @ Cardinals || 0–2 || Lanier || Roe (0–1) || — || 4,030 || 0–1
|- bgcolor="ffbbbb"
| 2 || April 20 || @ Cardinals || 3–5 || Munger || Rescigno (0–1) || — || 2,272 || 0–2
|- bgcolor="ffbbbb"
| 3 || April 21 || Reds || 2–4 || Beggs || Sewell (0–1) || — || 10,877 || 0–3
|- bgcolor="ccffcc"
| 4 || April 26 || Cubs || 6–1 || Roe (1–1) || Fleming || — || 3,463 || 1–3
|- bgcolor="ffbbbb"
| 5 || April 28 || @ Reds || 0–2 || Heusser || Butcher (0–1) || — || 1,080 || 1–4
|- bgcolor="ccffcc"
| 6 || April 29 || @ Reds || 7–3 || Sewell (1–1) || Ferguson || — || 2,695 || 2–4
|- bgcolor="ccffcc"
| 7 || April 30 || @ Reds || 7–1 || Strincevich (1–0) || Riddle || — || — || 3–4
|- bgcolor="ffbbbb"
| 8 || April 30 || @ Reds || 1–4 || Walters || Rescigno (0–2) || — || 16,060 || 3–5
|-

|- bgcolor="ccffcc"
| 9 || May 2 || Cardinals || 3–1 || Roe (2–1) || Jurisich || Cuccurullo (1) || 4,895 || 4–5
|- bgcolor="ffbbbb"
| 10 || May 3 || Cardinals || 1–5 || Gumbert || Sewell (1–2) || — || 5,007 || 4–6
|- bgcolor="ccffcc"
| 11 || May 4 || Cardinals || 6–3 || Butcher (1–1) || Cooper || — || 3,877 || 5–6
|- bgcolor="ccffcc"
| 12 || May 7 || @ Cubs || 6–5 (14) || Sewell (2–2) || Derringer || — || — || 6–6
|- bgcolor="ccffcc"
| 13 || May 7 || @ Cubs || 3–2 (11) || Rescigno (1–2) || Wyse || Butcher (1) || 19,067 || 7–6
|- bgcolor="ccffcc"
| 14 || May 10 || Braves || 4–2 || Strincevich (2–0) || Barrett || Cuccurullo (2) || 23,011 || 8–6
|- bgcolor="ffbbbb"
| 15 || May 11 || Braves || 2–7 || Tobin || Butcher (1–2) || — || 2,509 || 8–7
|- bgcolor="ffbbbb"
| 16 || May 12 || Braves || 3–10 || Andrews || Roe (2–2) || — || 2,302 || 8–8
|- bgcolor="ffbbbb"
| 17 || May 13 || Braves || 2–16 || Barrett || Rescigno (1–3) || — || 4,037 || 8–9
|- bgcolor="ccffcc"
| 18 || May 14 || Giants || 1–0 (10) || Sewell (3–2) || Voiselle || — || — || 9–9
|- bgcolor="ccffcc"
| 19 || May 14 || Giants || 8–2 || Strincevich (3–0) || Pyle || — || 23,771 || 10–9
|- bgcolor="ffbbbb"
| 20 || May 15 || Giants || 7–8 || Adams || Cuccurullo (0–1) || Polli || 1,699 || 10–10
|- bgcolor="ccffcc"
| 21 || May 17 || Dodgers || 8–5 (6) || Roe (3–2) || McLish || — || 18,748 || 11–10
|- bgcolor="ccffcc"
| 22 || May 18 || Dodgers || 4–3 || Butcher (2–2) || Melton || — || 3,361 || 12–10
|- bgcolor="ccffcc"
| 23 || May 19 || Dodgers || 5–2 || Sewell (4–2) || Webber || — || 2,520 || 13–10
|- bgcolor="ccffcc"
| 24 || May 20 || Phillies || 4–3 || Strincevich (4–0) || Gerheauser || — || 4,096 || 14–10
|- bgcolor="ccffcc"
| 25 || May 21 || Phillies || 4–3 || Butcher (3–2) || Schanz || — || — || 15–10
|- bgcolor="ffbbbb"
| 26 || May 21 || Phillies || 4–9 || Barrett || Rescigno (1–4) || — || 23,009 || 15–11
|- bgcolor="ccffcc"
| 27 || May 24 || @ Braves || 8–1 || Sewell (5–2) || Tobin || — || 1,706 || 16–11
|- bgcolor="ffbbbb"
| 28 || May 25 || @ Braves || 0–1 || Javery || Strincevich (4–1) || — || 1,318 || 16–12
|- bgcolor="ccffcc"
| 29 || May 26 || @ Braves || 7–5 || Rescigno (2–4) || Hutchinson || Sewell (1) || 1,518 || 17–12
|- bgcolor="ccffcc"
| 30 || May 28 || @ Phillies || 4–0 || Sewell (6–2) || Schanz || — || — || 18–12
|- bgcolor="ffbbbb"
| 31 || May 28 || @ Phillies || 2–8 || Barrett || Strincevich (4–2) || — || — || 18–13
|- bgcolor="ccffcc"
| 32 || May 29 || @ Phillies || 3–2 (11) || Rescigno (3–4) || Raffensberger || — || — || 19–13
|- bgcolor="ffbbbb"
| 33 || May 30 || @ Dodgers || 3–9 || Flowers || Butcher (3–3) || Ostermueller || — || 19–14
|- bgcolor="ffbbbb"
| 34 || May 30 || @ Dodgers || 3–4 || Gregg || Rescigno (3–5) || Davis || 25,845 || 19–15
|- bgcolor="ffbbbb"
| 35 || May 31 || @ Dodgers || 4–8 || McLish || Strincevich (4–3) || — || 16,993 || 19–16
|-

|- bgcolor="ccffcc"
| 36 || June 1 || @ Dodgers || 2–1 || Sewell (7–2) || Davis || — || — || 20–16
|- bgcolor="ffbbbb"
| 37 || June 2 || @ Giants || 4–6 || Fischer || Roe (3–3) || Polli || 2,532 || 20–17
|- bgcolor="ccffcc"
| 38 || June 3 || @ Giants || 7–6 (10) || Rescigno (4–5) || Adams || — || 9,171 || 21–17
|- bgcolor="ccffcc"
| 39 || June 4 || @ Giants || 9–4 || Ostermueller (1–0) || Voiselle || Rescigno (1) || — || 22–17
|- bgcolor="ccffcc"
| 40 || June 4 || @ Giants || 7–4 || Roe (4–3) || Pyle || Rescigno (2) || 30,659 || 23–17
|- bgcolor="ccffcc"
| 41 || June 7 || Reds || 4–2 || Sewell (8–2) || de la Cruz || Rescigno (3) || 17,161 || 24–17
|- bgcolor="ffbbbb"
| 42 || June 8 || Cubs || 6–10 || Vandenberg || Roe (4–4) || — || 2,616 || 24–18
|- bgcolor="ffffff"
| 43 || June 9 || Cubs || 3–3 (11) ||  ||  || — || 13,119 || 24–18
|- bgcolor="ccffcc"
| 44 || June 10 || Cubs || 9–4 || Roe (5–4) || Fleming || — || 1,710 || 25–18
|- bgcolor="ffbbbb"
| 45 || June 11 || Cubs || 0–5 || Erickson || Butcher (3–4) || — || — || 25–19
|- bgcolor="ffbbbb"
| 46 || June 11 || Cubs || 0–1 || Chipman || Strincevich (4–4) || — || 23,016 || 25–20
|- bgcolor="ccffcc"
| 47 || June 13 || @ Reds || 3–2 (5) || Starr (1–0) || Heusser || — || 2,460 || 26–20
|- bgcolor="ffbbbb"
| 48 || June 14 || @ Reds || 2–3 (11) || Walters || Rescigno (4–6) || — || 6,455 || 26–21
|- bgcolor="ccffcc"
| 49 || June 15 || @ Reds || 1–0 || Butcher (4–4) || de la Cruz || — || 1,101 || 27–21
|- bgcolor="ffbbbb"
| 50 || June 17 || @ Cardinals || 1–2 || Munger || Roe (5–5) || — || 18,645 || 27–22
|- bgcolor="ffbbbb"
| 51 || June 18 || @ Cardinals || 2–12 || Cooper || Sewell (8–3) || — || — || 27–23
|- bgcolor="ccffcc"
| 52 || June 18 || @ Cardinals || 3–1 || Ostermueller (2–0) || Lanier || — || 16,292 || 28–23
|- bgcolor="ffbbbb"
| 53 || June 20 || Reds || 0–3 || Walters || Butcher (4–5) || — || 7,369 || 28–24
|- bgcolor="ccffcc"
| 54 || June 21 || Reds || 2–1 || Starr (2–0) || Heusser || — || 2,414 || 29–24
|- bgcolor="ccffcc"
| 55 || June 22 || Reds || 9–4 || Sewell (9–3) || de la Cruz || — || — || 30–24
|- bgcolor="ccffcc"
| 56 || June 22 || Reds || 7–4 || Strincevich (5–4) || Gumbert || — || 5,394 || 31–24
|- bgcolor="ffffff"
| 57 || June 23 || Cardinals || 5–5 (14) ||  ||  || — || 12,086 || 31–24
|- bgcolor="ffbbbb"
| 58 || June 24 || Cardinals || 0–16 || Cooper || Ostermueller (2–1) || — || 4,899 || 31–25
|- bgcolor="ffbbbb"
| 59 || June 25 || Cardinals || 1–2 || Munger || Sewell (9–4) || — || — || 31–26
|- bgcolor="ffffff"
| 60 || June 25 || Cardinals || 5–5 ||  ||  || — || 33,111 || 31–26
|- bgcolor="ccffcc"
| 61 || June 28 || Giants || 9–2 || Butcher (5–5) || Fischer || — || 18,479 || 32–26
|- bgcolor="ffffff"
| 62 || June 29 || Giants || 1–1 (5) ||  ||  || — || 2,057 || 32–26
|- bgcolor="ffbbbb"
| 63 || June 30 || Giants || 5–7 || Adams || Sewell (9–5) || — || — || 32–27
|- bgcolor="ccffcc"
| 64 || June 30 || Giants || 9–8 || Cuccurullo (1–1) || Adams || — || 5,378 || 33–27
|-

|- bgcolor="ccffcc"
| 65 || July 1 || Braves || 5–1 || Starr (3–0) || Tobin || — || 2,940 || 34–27
|- bgcolor="ffbbbb"
| 66 || July 2 || Braves || 1–4 || Andrews || Roe (5–6) || — || — || 34–28
|- bgcolor="ccffcc"
| 67 || July 2 || Braves || 7–6 (12) || Sewell (10–5) || Barrett || — || 16,076 || 35–28
|- bgcolor="ffbbbb"
| 68 || July 4 || Phillies || 2–3 || Gerheauser || Sewell (10–6) || Schanz || — || 35–29
|- bgcolor="ccffcc"
| 69 || July 4 || Phillies || 4–0 || Butcher (6–5) || Lee || — || 16,285 || 36–29
|- bgcolor="ffbbbb"
| 70 || July 5 || Phillies || 2–12 || Barrett || Starr (3–1) || — || 2,055 || 36–30
|- bgcolor="ccffcc"
| 71 || July 6 || Phillies || 6–5 || Strincevich (6–4) || Raffensberger || Rescigno (4) || 9,136 || 37–30
|- bgcolor="ccffcc"
| 72 || July 7 || Dodgers || 13–2 || Ostermueller (3–1) || Melton || — || 2,356 || 38–30
|- bgcolor="ccffcc"
| 73 || July 8 || Dodgers || 8–5 || Sewell (11–6) || McLish || — || 3,732 || 39–30
|- bgcolor="ccffcc"
| 74 || July 9 || Dodgers || 10–1 || Roe (6–6) || Head || — || — || 40–30
|- bgcolor="ccffcc"
| 75 || July 9 || Dodgers || 9–7 || Rescigno (5–6) || Davis || Ostermueller (2) || 18,706 || 41–30
|- bgcolor="ccffcc"
| 76 || July 13 || @ Cubs || 3–2 || Ostermueller (4–1) || Wyse || — || 7,160 || 42–30
|- bgcolor="ffbbbb"
| 77 || July 14 || @ Cubs || 5–11 || Vandenberg || Starr (3–2) || — || 5,630 || 42–31
|- bgcolor="ffbbbb"
| 78 || July 15 || @ Cubs || 3–4 || Fleming || Roe (6–7) || Derringer || 6,972 || 42–32
|- bgcolor="ffbbbb"
| 79 || July 16 || @ Cubs || 0–1 || Wyse || Sewell (11–7) || — || — || 42–33
|- bgcolor="ccffcc"
| 80 || July 16 || @ Cubs || 1–0 || Butcher (7–5) || Passeau || — || 40,920 || 43–33
|- bgcolor="ffbbbb"
| 81 || July 18 || @ Giants || 2–5 || Voiselle || Ostermueller (4–2) || — || 26,164 || 43–34
|- bgcolor="ffbbbb"
| 82 || July 19 || @ Phillies || 2–4 || Raffensberger || Strincevich (6–5) || — || 7,784 || 43–35
|- bgcolor="ccffcc"
| 83 || July 20 || @ Phillies || 4–1 || Starr (4–2) || Lee || — || — || 44–35
|- bgcolor="ffbbbb"
| 84 || July 20 || @ Phillies || 2–3 (11) || Schanz || Rescigno (5–7) || — || — || 44–36
|- bgcolor="ccffcc"
| 85 || July 21 || @ Phillies || 5–3 || Butcher (8–5) || Gerheauser || — || 8,527 || 45–36
|- bgcolor="ccffcc"
| 86 || July 22 || @ Dodgers || 11–0 || Ostermueller (5–2) || Warren || — || 8,479 || 46–36
|- bgcolor="ccffcc"
| 87 || July 23 || @ Dodgers || 7–5 || Rescigno (6–7) || Gregg || — || — || 47–36
|- bgcolor="ccffcc"
| 88 || July 23 || @ Dodgers || 9–4 (11) || Strincevich (7–5) || Webber || Rescigno (5) || 16,571 || 48–36
|- bgcolor="ffbbbb"
| 89 || July 24 || @ Dodgers || 7–12 || Fuchs || Sewell (11–8) || Davis || 9,072 || 48–37
|- bgcolor="ccffcc"
| 90 || July 25 || @ Giants || 15–0 || Butcher (9–5) || Barthelson || — || 4,524 || 49–37
|- bgcolor="ccffcc"
| 91 || July 26 || @ Giants || 6–5 || Ostermueller (6–2) || Feldman || Strincevich (1) || 12,909 || 50–37
|- bgcolor="ffbbbb"
| 92 || July 28 || @ Giants || 0–4 || Voiselle || Roe (6–8) || — || 12,871 || 50–38
|- bgcolor="ccffcc"
| 93 || July 29 || @ Braves || 3–0 || Sewell (12–8) || Tobin || — || 2,065 || 51–38
|- bgcolor="ffbbbb"
| 94 || July 30 || @ Braves || 4–6 || Klopp || Starr (4–3) || Tobin || — || 51–39
|- bgcolor="ffbbbb"
| 95 || July 30 || @ Braves || 0–2 || Javery || Strincevich (7–6) || — || 7,143 || 51–40
|- bgcolor="ccffcc"
| 96 || July 31 || @ Braves || 9–2 || Ostermueller (7–2) || Andrews || — || 1,346 || 52–40
|-

|- bgcolor="ccffcc"
| 97 || August 1 || @ Braves || 13–8 || Starr (5–3) || Tobin || Sewell (2) || 1,787 || 53–40
|- bgcolor="ffbbbb"
| 98 || August 2 || Cardinals || 4–8 || Lanier || Sewell (12–9) || — || 27,481 || 53–41
|- bgcolor="ffbbbb"
| 99 || August 3 || Cardinals || 2–15 || Wilks || Roe (6–9) || — || 3,001 || 53–42
|- bgcolor="ffbbbb"
| 100 || August 4 || Cubs || 3–4 || Derringer || Butcher (9–6) || — || 10,022 || 53–43
|- bgcolor="ffbbbb"
| 101 || August 5 || Cubs || 2–7 || Fleming || Ostermueller (7–3) || Passeau || 2,861 || 53–44
|- bgcolor="ccffcc"
| 102 || August 6 || Cubs || 13–5 || Roe (7–9) || Derringer || Starr (1) || — || 54–44
|- bgcolor="ccffcc"
| 103 || August 6 || Cubs || 5–4 || Strincevich (8–6) || Chipman || Roe (1) || 13,362 || 55–44
|- bgcolor="ffbbbb"
| 104 || August 8 || Giants || 4–8 || Voiselle || Butcher (9–7) || — || 2,277 || 55–45
|- bgcolor="ccffcc"
| 105 || August 9 || Giants || 4–3 || Ostermueller (8–3) || Fischer || — || 12,683 || 56–45
|- bgcolor="ccffcc"
| 106 || August 10 || Giants || 10–4 || Roe (8–9) || Brewer || — || 4,324 || 57–45
|- bgcolor="ccffcc"
| 107 || August 11 || Giants || 12–8 || Cuccurullo (2–1) || Pyle || — || 13,024 || 58–45
|- bgcolor="ccffcc"
| 108 || August 12 || Giants || 8–0 || Butcher (10–7) || Voiselle || — || 3,335 || 59–45
|- bgcolor="ccffcc"
| 109 || August 13 || Braves || 8–1 || Sewell (13–9) || Tobin || — || — || 60–45
|- bgcolor="ccffcc"
| 110 || August 13 || Braves || 3–1 || Ostermueller (9–3) || Hutchings || — || 15,079 || 61–45
|- bgcolor="ccffcc"
| 111 || August 14 || Braves || 5–0 || Roe (9–9) || Barrett || — || 2,409 || 62–45
|- bgcolor="ccffcc"
| 112 || August 15 || Braves || 7–5 || Rescigno (7–7) || Hutchinson || Strincevich (2) || 12,397 || 63–45
|- bgcolor="ccffcc"
| 113 || August 17 || Phillies || 7–6 || Rescigno (8–7) || Karl || — || — || 64–45
|- bgcolor="ccffcc"
| 114 || August 17 || Phillies || 6–5 (10) || Strincevich (9–6) || Barrett || — || 3,262 || 65–45
|- bgcolor="ffbbbb"
| 115 || August 18 || Phillies || 2–3 || Raffensberger || Sewell (13–10) || — || 14,566 || 65–46
|- bgcolor="ccffcc"
| 116 || August 19 || Phillies || 5–3 || Roe (10–9) || Gerheauser || — || 3,327 || 66–46
|- bgcolor="ccffcc"
| 117 || August 20 || Dodgers || 10–7 || Butcher (11–7) || Chapman || Cuccurullo (3) || — || 67–46
|- bgcolor="ccffcc"
| 118 || August 20 || Dodgers || 7–1 || Strincevich (10–6) || Wyatt || — || 20,953 || 68–46
|- bgcolor="ccffcc"
| 119 || August 21 || Dodgers || 7–6 (10) || Starr (6–3) || Webber || — || 3,039 || 69–46
|- bgcolor="ccffcc"
| 120 || August 22 || Dodgers || 7–5 || Sewell (14–10) || Sunkel || — || 19,444 || 70–46
|- bgcolor="ffbbbb"
| 121 || August 25 || @ Cardinals || 0–4 || Schmidt || Roe (10–10) || — || 11,000 || 70–47
|- bgcolor="ccffcc"
| 122 || August 27 || @ Cardinals || 14–6 || Sewell (15–10) || Lanier || — || — || 71–47
|- bgcolor="ffffff"
| 123 || August 27 || @ Cardinals || 1–1 (10) ||  ||  || — || 10,676 || 71–47
|- bgcolor="ffbbbb"
| 124 || August 29 || @ Cubs || 4–15 || Derringer || Butcher (11–8) || — || — || 71–48
|- bgcolor="ccffcc"
| 125 || August 29 || @ Cubs || 5–4 || Roe (11–10) || Passeau || — || 11,649 || 72–48
|- bgcolor="ffbbbb"
| 126 || August 30 || @ Cubs || 5–12 || Wyse || Sewell (15–11) || Lynn || — || 72–49
|- bgcolor="ffbbbb"
| 127 || August 30 || @ Cubs || 3–6 || Passeau || Starr (6–4) || Wyse || 17,438 || 72–50
|-

|- bgcolor="ccffcc"
| 128 || September 1 || Cardinals || 3–2 || Ostermueller (10–3) || Lanier || — || 17,030 || 73–50
|- bgcolor="ccffcc"
| 129 || September 2 || Cardinals || 5–4 || Butcher (12–8) || Wilks || — || 5,864 || 74–50
|- bgcolor="ccffcc"
| 130 || September 3 || Cardinals || 6–5 || Sewell (16–11) || Cooper || — || — || 75–50
|- bgcolor="ccffcc"
| 131 || September 3 || Cardinals || 8–2 || Strincevich (11–6) || Brecheen || — || 34,395 || 76–50
|- bgcolor="ffbbbb"
| 132 || September 4 || Cubs || 3–6 || Erickson || Butcher (12–9) || — || — || 76–51
|- bgcolor="ccffcc"
| 133 || September 4 || Cubs || 4–3 (6) || Rescigno (9–7) || Derringer || — || 18,175 || 77–51
|- bgcolor="ffbbbb"
| 134 || September 7 || @ Reds || 1–2 || Heusser || Ostermueller (10–4) || — || 4,702 || 77–52
|- bgcolor="ffbbbb"
| 135 || September 9 || @ Reds || 2–3 || Shoun || Sewell (16–12) || — || 1,818 || 77–53
|- bgcolor="ccffcc"
| 136 || September 10 || @ Reds || 7–5 || Strincevich (12–6) || Walters || — || — || 78–53
|- bgcolor="ffbbbb"
| 137 || September 10 || @ Reds || 0–2 || Carter || Butcher (12–10) || — || 17,343 || 78–54
|- bgcolor="ccffcc"
| 138 || September 12 || @ Cardinals || 5–3 || Ostermueller (11–4) || Schmidt || — || — || 79–54
|- bgcolor="ccffcc"
| 139 || September 12 || @ Cardinals || 6–5 || Roe (12–10) || Byerly || Starr (2) || 6,445 || 80–54
|- bgcolor="ccffcc"
| 140 || September 13 || @ Cardinals || 7–3 || Sewell (17–12) || Brecheen || — || — || 81–54
|- bgcolor="ccffcc"
| 141 || September 13 || @ Cardinals || 10–5 || Rescigno (10–7) || Lanier || Starr (3) || 6,495 || 82–54
|- bgcolor="ffbbbb"
| 142 || September 15 || Reds || 3–5 (10) || Walters || Rescigno (10–8) || — || 12,198 || 82–55
|- bgcolor="ffbbbb"
| 143 || September 16 || Reds || 1–2 || de la Cruz || Butcher (12–11) || — || — || 82–56
|- bgcolor="ffbbbb"
| 144 || September 16 || Reds || 1–3 || Carter || Starr (6–5) || — || 3,670 || 82–57
|- bgcolor="ccffcc"
| 145 || September 17 || Reds || 7–1 || Sewell (18–12) || Shoun || — || — || 83–57
|- bgcolor="ffbbbb"
| 146 || September 17 || Reds || 1–2 (10) || Gumbert || Ostermueller (11–5) || — || 19,823 || 83–58
|- bgcolor="ccffcc"
| 147 || September 20 || @ Dodgers || 2–1 || Strincevich (13–6) || Wells || — || 1,338 || 84–58
|- bgcolor="ccffcc"
| 148 || September 21 || @ Dodgers || 10–4 || Sewell (19–12) || Gregg || — || — || 85–58
|- bgcolor="ccffcc"
| 149 || September 21 || @ Dodgers || 14–6 || Roe (13–10) || Zachary || — || 2,579 || 86–58
|- bgcolor="ccffcc"
| 150 || September 23 || @ Giants || 6–4 (13) || Sewell (20–12) || Adams || Cuccurullo (4) || 3,749 || 87–58
|- bgcolor="ffbbbb"
| 151 || September 24 || @ Giants || 4–5 || Voiselle || Ostermueller (11–6) || — || — || 87–59
|- bgcolor="ccffcc"
| 152 || September 24 || @ Giants || 3–2 (10) || Strincevich (14–6) || Melton || — || 17,778 || 88–59
|- bgcolor="ffbbbb"
| 153 || September 25 || @ Braves || 4–5 (13) || Barrett || Roe (13–11) || — || 463 || 88–60
|- bgcolor="ccffcc"
| 154 || September 26 || @ Braves || 6–2 || Butcher (13–11) || Andrews || — || 1,644 || 89–60
|- bgcolor="ffbbbb"
| 155 || September 27 || @ Braves || 3–4 || Javery || Strincevich (14–7) || Hutchings || 655 || 89–61
|- bgcolor="ffbbbb"
| 156 || September 29 || @ Phillies || 0–3 || Raffensberger || Ostermueller (11–7) || — || 1,000 || 89–62
|-

|- bgcolor="ccffcc"
| 157 || October 1 || @ Phillies || 9–1 || Sewell (21–12) || Schanz || — || — || 90–62
|- bgcolor="ffbbbb"
| 158 || October 1 || @ Phillies || 1–7 || Barrett || Gilmore (0–1) || — || — || 90–63
|-

|-
| Legend:       = Win       = Loss       = TieBold = Pirates team member

Opening Day lineup

All-Star Game
The Pirates hosted the 1944 Major League Baseball All-Star Game on July 11, 1944, at Forbes Field. Pitcher Rip Sewell, infielder Bob Elliott, and outfielder Vince DiMaggio were selected for the National League squad. Pirates pitchers Max Butcher and Cookie Cuccurullo were named the NL's batting practice pitchers and Pirates catcher Spud Davis was the NL's batting practice catcher. Honus Wagner was named an honorary coach, the first time this honor was bestowed in Major League Baseball's All-Star Game.

Roster

Player stats

Batting

Starters by position 
Note: Pos = Position; G = Games played; AB = At bats; H = Hits; Avg. = Batting average; HR = Home runs; RBI = Runs batted in

Other batters 
Note: G = Games played; AB = At bats; H = Hits; Avg. = Batting average; HR = Home runs; RBI = Runs batted in

Pitching

Starting pitchers 
Note: G = Games pitched; IP = Innings pitched; W = Wins; L = Losses; ERA = Earned run average; SO = Strikeouts

Other pitchers 
Note: G = Games pitched; IP = Innings pitched; W = Wins; L = Losses; ERA = Earned run average; SO = Strikeouts

Relief pitchers 
Note: G = Games pitched; W = Wins; L = Losses; SV = Saves; ERA = Earned run average; SO = Strikeouts

Farm system

References

External links
 1944 Pittsburgh Pirates team page at Baseball Reference
 1944 Pittsburgh Pirates Page at Baseball Almanac

Pittsburgh Pirates seasons
Pittsburgh Pirates season
Pittsburg Pir